Harry Cruickshank Harley (4 June 1926 – 27 September 2014) was a Canadian politician who served as Liberal party member of the House of Commons of Canada. He was a physician by career.

Political career
Harley was first elected at the Halton riding in the 1962 general election, narrowly defeating the incumbent Charles Alexander Best in a result where the armed services vote swung over to the Liberals. He was subsequently re-elected in 1963 and 1965. After completing his term in the 27th Canadian Parliament in 1968, Harley left federal politics and did not seek further re-election. His departure was said to be for personal reasons only, and not because of Pierre Elliott Trudeau winning the Liberal leadership.

Electoral record

References

External links
 

1926 births
2014 deaths
Physicians from Ontario
Members of the House of Commons of Canada from Ontario
Liberal Party of Canada MPs
Politicians from Toronto